The Judicial Appointments Board for Scotland is an advisory non-departmental public body of the Scottish Government responsible for making recommendations on appointments to certain offices of the judiciary of Scotland. It was established in June 2002 on a non-statutory, ad hoc, basis by the Scottish Government, and was given statutory authority by the Judiciary and Courts (Scotland) Act 2008.

All recommendations are made to the First Minister, who must consult the Lord President of the Court of Session before making a recommendation to the monarch in relation to full-time, permanent, judiciary, or before any appointments are made by Scottish Ministers to temporary or part-time judicial office.

The board does not make recommendations for, or have any in role in the appointment of, justices of the peace, whose appointments are made by Scottish Ministers on the recommendation of Justice of the Peace Advisory Committees for each sheriffdom.

History
The Judicial Appointments Board was established in June 2002 on a non-statutory, ad hoc, basis by the Scottish Government, and was given statutory authority by the Judiciary and Courts (Scotland) Act 2008. The board was established on a statutory basis following criticism of its perceived lack of independence from political interference by the executive, and following the Scottish Government's consultation Strengthening Judicial Independence in a Modern Scotland.

In 2002 the board initially had equal numbers of lay and legally qualified members: 5 lay members, 3 judicial members, and 2 members from the legal profession (advocate and solicitors). The method of creating the board and appointing members was not without criticism.  The Law Society of Scotland in its members' magazine Journal was critical that the appointments process did not follow procedures recommended by the Committee on Standards in Public Life, and the chair of the board is a lay member, a situation said to be "unique in Europe", where the norm is for self-governing bodies to control judicial appointments.

In 2006 Sir Neil McIntosh, chair of the board, was critical that the Scottish Executive did not put the board on a statutory footing, as is the case for the Judicial Appointments Commission in England.

The board continues to be chaired by a lay member, who is appointed to the position by the Scottish Ministers. The chairing member is appointed for a maximum of 4 years, and may be reappointed.

Process
All recommendations are made to the First Minister, who must consult the Lord President of the Court of Session before making his or her recommendation to the monarch in relation to full-time judiciary.  Appointments to the offices of temporary sheriff principal, part-time sheriffs and part-time summary sheriffs are made by the Scottish Ministers.

Board members
The board has 12 members, with 4 judicial members appointed by the Lord President, and 2 legal members and 6 lay members appointed by the Scottish Ministers. Judicial members include 2 appointed from the Court of Session (but may not be either the Lord President or Lord Justice Clerk), a sheriff principal, and a sheriff. The legal members include an advocate and a solicitor.

As of August 2022, current board members were:
Chairing member: Dr Lindsay Montgomery CBE FRSE
Lay member: Ms Emma Marriott
Lay member: Mrs Deirdre Fulton
Lay member: Professor Stephen Tierney
Lay member: Ms Neelam Bakshi
Lay member: Mrs Liz Burnley CBE
Judicial member: The Hon. Lady Haldane KC, Senator
Judicial member: The Hon. Lord Weir KC, Senator
Judicial member: Sheriff Principal Aisha Anwar
Judicial member: Sheriff David Young KC
Judicial member: Mrs May Dunsmuir, President of the Health & Education Chamber of First Tier Tribunal for Scotland
Legal member: Vacant
Legal member: Ms Cat MacLean, Solicitor

Chairing members
Chairing members are always lay members of the board, and are appointed for a period of 4 years (up to a maximum of 8 years). The chairing member receives a daily fee of £350, and is eligible to claim expenses incurred whilst on board business.

Former Judicial members
Judicial members are appointed for 4 years (up to a maximum of 8 years) and receive no fees for work undertaken, though they may claim for incurred on board business.

Former Legal members
Legal members are appointed for 4 years (up to a maximum of 8 years) and receive a fee of £290 per day of board work, and they may claim for incurred on board business.

Former Lay members
Lay members are appointed for 4 years (up to a maximum of 8 years) and receive a fee of £290 per day of board work, and they may claim for incurred on board business.

Remit
The board has a remit for making recommendations on appointments to judicial offices as specified by Section 10 of the Judiciary and Courts (Scotland) Act 2008.

Judicial offices
 Senator of the College of Justice
 Chairman of the Scottish Land Court
 Temporary judge of the Court of Session or High Court of Justiciary
 Sheriff principal
 Sheriff
 Part-time sheriff
 Summary sheriff
 Part-time summary sheriff
 Scottish Tribunals
 Vice-President of Upper Tribunal
 Chamber President, First-tier Tribunal
 Deputy Chamber President, First-tier Tribunal
 Ordinary member, First-tier or Upper Tribunal
 Legal member, First-tier or Upper Tribunal
 The Parole Board for Scotland

Business Management Unit
The board is supported by its Business Management Unit, which is independent of the Scottish Government, and is based in Edinburgh at Thistle House. The team is headed by Chief Executive, Ms Paula Stevenson.

Lay Appointments Advisors
The members of the board are supported in sifting and interviewing candidates for judicial office, and have all the powers of a lay member of the board except they cannot take part in the decision making of the board. The board has appointed 5 lay appointments advisors for a period of 3 years from 1 January 2016 to 31 December 2018, and they may be appointed for a further 3 years.

References

External links
Official website

2002 establishments in Scotland
Legal organisations based in Scotland
2002 in British law
Courts of Scotland
Government-related organisations based in Edinburgh
Judiciary of Scotland
Advisory non-departmental public bodies of the Scottish Government
College of Justice
Government agencies established in 2002
Government recruitment
Judicial nominations and appointments